Biagio Maria Bellotti (Busto Arsizio, 26 February 1714 – Busto Arsizio, 5 August 1789) was an Italian painter, architect, sculptor, musician and canon.

18th-century Italian painters
Italian male painters
Painters from Lombardy
1714 births
1789 deaths
18th-century Italian male artists